Clynder is a place on the western shore of the Gare Loch, Argyll and Bute, Scotland.

Historically in the County of Dunbarton, Clynder is one of a string of small settlements on the Rosneath Peninsula. It is almost directly opposite Rhu, and overlooks the HMNB Clyde base at Faslane.

The hills immediately behind Clynder were formerly used as apiaries, the types of heather found there being particularly attractive to bees.

References

Villages in Argyll and Bute